Maurizia Cacciatori (born 6 April 1973) is an Italian former volleyball player and sport commentator.
 
Born in Carrara, Cacciatori has racked up 228 appearances in the Italian national team, winning a gold medal at the 2001 Mediterranean Games and being awarded best setter at the 1998 FIVB Volleyball Women's World Championship. In 2006, she was a contestant in the reality show L'Isola dei Famosi (Italian version of Celebrity Survivor). Since 2007 she is a sport commentator for Sky Sport.

Teams 

1986-89 - Pallavolo Carrarese (Serie B, Serie A2).
1989-93 - Sirio Perugia (Serie A1).
1993-95 - Amazzoni Agrigento (Serie A1).
1995-98 - Volley Bergamo (Serie A1).
1998-99 - Ester Naples (Serie A1).
1999-03 - Volley Bergamo (Serie A1).
2003-05 - Marichal Tenerife (Superliga Femenina de Voleibol).
2005-06 - Start Arzano (Serie A1).
2006-07 - Ícaro Alaró (Superliga 2).

Palmarès 
 5 National Leagues
 Bergamo: 95-96, 96-97, 97-98, 01-02
 Tenerife: 03-04
 5 National Cups
 Perugia: 91-92 
 Bergamo: 95-96, 96-97, 97-98
 Tenerife 03-04
 3 SuperCups
 Bergamo: 1996, 1997
 3 Champions Leagues
 Bergamo: 1997, 2000 
 Tenerife: 2004
 1 CEV Cup
 Naples: 1999

References

External links 
 
 

1973 births
People from Carrara
Living people
Italian women's volleyball players
Italian expatriate sportspeople in Spain
Expatriate volleyball players in Spain
Olympic volleyball players of Italy
Volleyball players at the 2000 Summer Olympics
Participants in Italian reality television series
Mediterranean Games gold medalists for Italy
Competitors at the 2001 Mediterranean Games
Mediterranean Games medalists in volleyball
Sportspeople from the Province of Massa-Carrara